In enzymology, a 3,4-dihydroxyphenylacetate 2,3-dioxygenase is an enzyme that catalyzes the chemical reaction

3,4-dihydroxyphenylacetate + O2  2-hydroxy-5-carboxymethylmuconate semialdehyde

Thus, the two substrates of this enzyme are 3,4-dihydroxyphenylacetate and O2, whereas its product is 2-hydroxy-5-carboxymethylmuconate semialdehyde.

This enzyme belongs to the family of oxidoreductases, specifically those acting on single donors with O2 as oxidant and incorporation of two atoms of oxygen into the substrate (oxygenases). The oxygen incorporated need not be derived from O2.  The systematic name of this enzyme class is 3,4-dihydroxyphenylacetate:oxygen 2,3-oxidoreductase (decyclizing). Other names in common use include 3,4-dihydroxyphenylacetic acid 2,3-dioxygenase, HPC dioxygenase, and homoprotocatechuate 2,3-dioxygenase.  This enzyme participates in tyrosine metabolism.  It employs one cofactor, iron.

Structural studies

References 

 
 
 

EC 1.13.11
Iron enzymes
Enzymes of known structure